Nupharamine is an alkaloid found in Nuphar japonica and in castoreum.

Nuphar japonica contains nupharamine, and methyl and ethyl esters of nupharamine.

References 

3-Furyl compounds
Piperidine alkaloids
Tertiary alcohols